Pabianice station is a railway station located in the town of Pabianice, Łódź Voivodeship, Poland. According to PKP it has the status of a regional station. It serves mainly regional traffic between Łódź and Sieradz, although it is also a stopping point for PKP Intercity services between Warsaw and Wrocław.

History 
The station was built as part of the Warsaw-Kalisz Railway, which was opened in 1902. The main building of the station was made in the Renaissance Revival style, the same which was used for other smaller stations of the line such as those in Łowicz, Zgierz, Łask, Zduńska Wola and Sieradz. Unlike some of the latter stations, this one has retained its original facades despite major refurbishment in 1934, 2005 and 2011.

From 1902 until 2019 the station utilized 3 platforms: one single-edged and two double-edged, but each platform acted like single-edged. From 2019 till September 2020 the platform layout of the station was changed due to refurbishment of the railway served by station. The new layout consists of one island platform and one side platform, each connected with an underground passage.

From 1924 to 1968 the station served as a terminal stop for a tram line, which runs from Łódź via Ksawerów. In 1968 the tram terminal was dismantled after the construction of a turning loop near the intersection of Łaska and Wiejska streets, located 300 m southwest of the station.

Public transit 
The station is served by bus lines maintained by MZK Pabianice (bold name indicates terminal stop):

 Line 1: Dworzec PKP - Waltera-Jankego
 Line 3: Dworzec PKP - Sikorskiego
 Line 5: Dworzec PKP - Waltera-Jankego
 Line 260: Waltera-Jankego - Dworzec PKP - Kudrowice - Górka Pabianicka
 Line 262: Waltera-Jankego - Dworzec PKP - Kudrowice
 Line 265: Dworzec PKP - Pawlikowice (selected services)
 Line T: Dworzec PKP - Rzgów - Guzew

Moreover, the area of the station is served by two lines operated by MPK Łódź:

 Tram line 41 (Łódź Plac Niepodległości - Pabianice Wiejska) - tram stop located at the intersection of Łaska and Szare Szeregi streets.
 Night bus line N4B (Pabianice Dworzec PKP - Stoki Skalna) - bus terminus.

Train services
The station is served by the following services:

 Intercity services (IC) Wrocław Główny — Łódź — Warszawa Wschodnia
Intercity services (IC) Białystok - Warszawa - Łódź - Ostrów Wielkopolski - Wrocław
Intercity services (IC) Ełk - Białystok - Warszawa - Łódź - Ostrów Wielkopolski - Wrocław
 Intercity services (IC) Zgorzelec - Legnica - Wrocław - Ostrów Wielkopolski - Łódź - Warszawa
 InterRegio services (IR) Ostrów Wielkopolski — Łódź — Warszawa Główna
 InterRegio services (IR) Poznań Główny — Ostrów Wielkopolski — Łódź — Warszawa Główna
 Regiona services (PR) Łódź Kaliska — Ostrów Wielkopolski 
 Regional services (PR) Łódź Kaliska — Ostrów Wielkopolski — Poznań Główny

References 

Railway stations in Poland opened in 1902
Railway stations in Łódź Voivodeship
Railway stations served by Łódzka Kolej Aglomeracyjna